S.H. Heironimus Co. (also known as Heironimus) was an American department store chain based in Roanoke, Virginia. S.H. Heironimus opened his first store in downtown Roanoke in 1890. At its peak, Heironimus had several locations around Roanoke and Lynchburg. In 1993, Heironimus was acquired by the Texas-based retailer Dunlaps, which initially invested in improving the stores' inventory and appearance. In January 1996, the chain's flagship store in Downtown Roanoke was closed but locations in area malls remained open.

The chain occupied the increasingly untenable niche between discount stores like Wal-Mart and the variety and more upscale merchandise available at regional malls. In 2004, Dunlaps announced that the remaining Heironimus stores would close as their inventory was liquidated. The Spartan Square location in Salem was the last to remain open before closing in January 2005.

The S.H. Heironimus Warehouse was listed on the National Register of Historic Places in 2006.

A description of being employed by the Heironimus store is written by Sandy Painter Hamilton. "Our employees were ethical, moral, hard working, religious people who treated our "family" of fellow employees with respect and dignity."

References

Defunct department stores based in Virginia
Retail companies established in 1890
Companies based in Roanoke, Virginia
Retail companies disestablished in 2005
Defunct companies based in Virginia
Department stores on the National Register of Historic Places
Commercial buildings on the National Register of Historic Places in Virginia
National Register of Historic Places in Roanoke, Virginia
1890 establishments in Virginia
2005 disestablishments in Virginia